Drepatelodes is a genus of moths of the Apatelodidae family.

Species
Drepatelodes contains the following species:
 Drepatelodes friburgensis (Schaus, 1924)
 Drepatelodes landolti Herbin & Monzón, 2015
 Drepatelodes ostenta (Schaus, 1905)
 Drepatelodes quadrilineata (Schaus, 1920)
 Drepatelodes tanais (Druce, 1898)
 Drepatelodes trilineata (Dognin, 1912)
 Drepatelodes umbrillinea (Schaus, 1905)
 Drepatelodes zacki Herbin & Monzón, 2015

References

 

Apatelodidae
Moth genera